is a 2013 Japanese animated film produced by ufotable based on The Garden of Sinners novels by Kinoko Nasu. It is a sequel of the series, preceded by A Study in Murder – Part 2 (2009). The film plays in two parts: Möbius Ring and Möbius Link.

Plot

Möbius Ring
Ring takes place in August 1998. After saving the life of a bystander who she happened to predict the death of, Shizune Seo speaks to Mikiya Kokutou in a cafe over her own ability to foresee the future. Possessing the "Prediction" type of precognition, she has to suffer the pain of seeing the death of loved ones twice, as well as the guilt of getting better grades than her peers even with no knowledge of the subject material. Kokutou explains to her that her ability is not as extraordinary as she thinks, and that it is more like an extension of the kind of prediction that ordinary humans can do based on current information. Seo leaves on a happy note after warning Kokutou of the misfortune that he would encounter with Shiki.

Mitsuru Kamekura, under the pseudonym of Meruka Kuramitsu, performs bombings-for-hire and succeeds every time. This is because he has the "Calculation" type of precognition, where he takes specific actions to ensure a specific future comes true. His right eye is able to foresee the future and his left eye shows the "path" that should be taken to achieve that future. Due to this ability, he falls under the impression that he is a slave to his own future. He performs bombings in order to achieve a future that even he cannot predict. When Shiki becomes a witness to one of his bombings, Mitsuru repeatedly attempts to kill her until she "kills" the vision of the future that he saw in his last attempt. This changes the future completely and Mitsuru's bomb unexpectedly goes off 5 minutes after the predicted time, allowing Shiki to catch him. Mitsuru is revealed to be a 14-year-old and Shiki lets him go after seeing that his right eye is of no use anymore. Mitsuru is forced to quit his bombing job and go to college.

Chronologically, the events that occur in Ring are the fourth in the timeline of the series.

Möbius Link
Link takes place in 2010. Ten years after the events of Kara no Kyoukai, the debt-riddled Mitsuru is hired by Shiki, who has become the head of the Ryougi family, partly thanks to Mana Ryougi, Shiki and Kokuto's daughter, liking a children's picture book he wrote and published in the meantime. Remarking that Mana saved him from a miserable fate, he takes her to see the Mother of Mifune, an old street fortune teller who predicted both SHIKI and Shiki's future many years ago.

Chronologically, the events that occur in Link are the tenth in the timeline of the series.

Cast

Maaya Sakamoto as 
Kenichi Suzumura as 
Yuka Iguchi as 
Akira Ishida as 
Hisako Kanemoto as

References

External links
 
 

2013 films
2013 anime films
Anime composed by Yuki Kajiura
Anime films based on light novels
Japanese animated films
2010s Japanese-language films
Kara no Kyōkai
Ufotable